The 1902 Wyoming gubernatorial election was held on November 4, 1902. Incumbent Republican Governor DeForest Richards ran for re-election. He was once again nominated by the Republican Party, and faced Cody Mayor George T. Beck, the Democratic nominee, and Socialist Party nominee Henry Breitenstein in the general election. Richards won re-election in a landslide, becoming the first Governor of Wyoming to win re-election. However, Richards did not end up serving a full second term; on April 28, 1903, he died in office, elevating Secretary of State Fenimore Chatterton to the Governorship and triggering a special election in 1904.

Party conventions
At the Republican convention on July 15, 1902, Richards, along with the other eligible Republican incumbents, was unanimously nominated for re-election. Similarly, George T. Beck, the newly elected Mayor of Cody, faced no opposition at the Democratic convention and was nominated unanimously.

General election

Results

Results by county

References

1902 Wyoming elections
1902
Wyoming